Pebbles, Volume 8 is a compilation album among the LPs in the Pebbles series.  The music on this album has no relation to Pebbles, Volume 8 that was released on CD many years later.

Release data

This album was released as an LP by BFD Records in 1980 (as #BFD-5025) and was kept in print for many years by AIP Records.

Notes on the tracks

"I Never Loved Her" by the Starfires is one of the most sought after garage rock singles and has brought $1,000 or more.  This band has no relation to the band of the same name that later evolved into the Outsiders (see Pebbles, Volume 9).  Question Mark & the Mysterians is one of the many Latino garage rock bands and is well known for their major hit with "96 Tears".  The Human Beinz also had a Top 40 hit with "Nobody but Me".  The Lollipop Shoppe was originally known as the Weeds, which is represented among the bonus tracks on the Pebbles, Volume 1 CD.

Track listing

Side 1:

 The Lollipop Shoppe: "You Must Be a Witch", 2:40
 The Starfires: "I Never Loved Her", 2:43
 The Gants: "I Wonder", 2:14
 The Sound Barrier: "(My) Baby's Gone", 2:49
 The JuJus: "Hey Little Girl", 2:06
 The Uncalled For: "Do Like Me", 2:44
 The Bruthers: "Bad Way to Go", 2:50
 The Clue: "Bad Times", 2:00
 Faine Jade: "It Ain't True", 3:09

Side 2:

 The Caravelles: "Lovin' Just My Style", 3:03
 The Human Beinz: "My Generation", 2:41
 Question Mark & the Mysterians: "Make You Mine", 2:46
 The Others: "I Can't Stand This Love, Goodbye", 2:07
 The Cindermen: "Don't Do it Some More", 1:50
 The Rovin' Flames: "How Many Times", 1:57
 The Rockin' Ramrods: "She Lied", 2:05
 Movin' Morfomen: "Run Girl Run", 1:52
 The Lemon Drops: "I Live in the Springtime", 2:52

Pebbles (series) albums
1980 compilation albums